A duelling pistol is a type of pistol that was manufactured in matching pairs to be used in a duel, when duels were customary. Duelling pistols are often single-shot flintlock or percussion black-powder pistols which fire a lead ball. Not all fine, antique pairs of pistols are duelling pistols, though they may be called so.

Design 

Until the mid-18th century, duels were typically fought with swords. In London, the first recorded pistol duel was in 1711 but the use of pistols was unusual until the 1760s. Thereafter they quickly took over and after 1785 it was rare for a sword duel to be fought in London. From about 1770 onwards, gunsmiths were producing pistols expressly made for duelling.

Standard flintlock pistols can have a noticeable delay between pulling the trigger and actually firing the bullet unless precisely tuned. Purpose-built duelling pistols have various improvements to make them more reliable and accurate.

Duelling pistols have long and heavy barrels - the added weight helped steady aim and reduce recoil. The barrels on earlier guns were cylindrical, while later ones tended to be octagonal. The barrels were given a blued or browned finish to reduce glare. Spurs on the trigger guards began appearing after around 1805 to provide a rest for the middle finger to improve the shooter's grip. Other features were saw handles, platinum-lined touch-holes and hair triggers. Reliability was important because if a duellist's pistol failed to fire, he was considered to have taken his shot and was not permitted to re-cock the pistol and try shooting again.

All component parts were manufactured, hand-finished and then adjusted with great care and precision, which made duelling pistols much more costly than standard firearms of the period. Special care was taken when moulding the lead bullets to ensure that there were no voids which would affect accuracy. In some duels, the pistols were carefully and identically loaded, and each duellist was offered his choice of the indistinguishable loaded pistols. Although sometimes the duellists would use their own pistols so the weapons would be different.

As duels were generally fought at short distances which were paced out, typically , between stationary opponents, extreme accuracy was not required.

The bullets loaded in them could weigh  in .52 caliber, or more in larger calibers. Injuries from such bullets, coupled with the primitive state of emergency medicine at the time when duels were commonplace, meant that pistol duels frequently resulted in fatalities, often some hours or days afterwards. 

Most English pistols had smooth bores, though some had scratch rifling, a subtle form of rifling which was difficult to see with the naked eye. Pistols with rifled barrels spin-stabilize the shot when it is fired, resulting in much improved accuracy. As a result, duelling pistols with rifled barrels were considered unsporting by many, although there was no unfairness so long as the pistols were identical. For some in the eighteenth century, duelling with less-accurate, smooth-bore weapons was preferred as they viewed it as allowing the judgement of God to take a role in deciding the outcome of the encounter.

In continental Europe, the use of smooth-bored pistols was considered cowardly, and rifled pistols were the norm. The short range most duels took place at, combined with the accuracy of rifled pistols meant their use substantially increased the chances of a fatality during a duel. A pair of rifled pistols often included a small hammer or mallet as an accessory; they used slightly oversized bullets and a hammer was needed to drive the bullet down the barrel when loading.

Pairs of duelling pistols can be easily confused with holster pistols and travelling pistols. These types are similar to duelling pistols in that they were muzzle-loading weapons that were sometimes expensively made and sold in matched, cased pairs with a set of accessories. Travelling pistols, also known as overcoat pistols, were intended for use by travellers to protect themselves from highwaymen and footpads; unlike duelling pistols, they were commonly rifled. Holster pistols, or horse pistols were used on horseback and carried in pairs in a leather holster slung across a horse's saddle. Although best suited for military use, they were often owned by civilians. Although their purpose was combat or self-defense, holster pistols were used on occasion to fight duels.

Use
It is often stated that duelling pistols came in identical pairs to put each duellist on an equal footing. However, it was acceptable for duels to be fought with different pistols and for each duellist to use their own pair, so they could use weapons they were familiar with. Two pairs of pistols allowed for a second exchange of shots if both missed and the challenger of the duel was intent on continuing. When a duel was fought with a single pair of pistols it was because neither duellist owned their own and the pistols were supplied by a third party.

There were various forms of pistol duel. In Britain, the favoured type was for the duellists to stand still at an agreed distance and shoot when given the signal. The rules of the "French method" of duelling required the duellists to begin back-to-back, walk a set number of paces before turning and firing.

A further type of duel, known as a barrier duel or a duel à volonté (at pleasure) had the duellists walk towards each other. As the distance closed they could fire at will. But if the first to fire missed, he was required to stand still and wait for his opponent's shot. The famous fictional duel between Pierre and Dolokhov in the novel War and Peace was of this kind. For an eye-witness account of such a duel, see Reynolds (1839).

Sport duelling pistols

During the late 19th and the early 20th centuries, duelling became a sport in which shooters fired at each other using non-lethal rounds. These consisted of wax bullets in a cartridge without any powder charge; the bullet was propelled only by the explosion of the cartridge's primer. Participants wore heavy, protective clothing and a metal helmet, similar to a fencing mask but with an eye-screen of thick glass. Pistol dueling was an associate (non-medal) event at the 1906 and 1908 Olympic games (see Olympic dueling).

The Fauré Le Page company of France made special pistols for sport duelling. These were break action, single-shot weapons that were fitted with a shield in front of the trigger, to protect the hand holding the pistol.

Manufacturers 
The use of pistols in duels became popular in the United Kingdom, France, and colonial America during the mid-eighteenth century. Initially standard holster or travelling pistols were mainly used, but by the end of the century special-purpose duelling pistols were being made by craftsmen in England, France, Germany, Austria, and the United States.

The most famous and innovative manufacturers were London-based companies such as Wogdon & Barton, Durs Egg, Manton, Mortimer, Nock, and Purdey. The name Wogden in particular became associated with duelling pistols, to the extent that a duel was sometimes referred to by lawyers as a "Wogden Case".

Pairs of duelling pistols were often supplied in compartmentalised wooden cases along with a powder flask, rods for cleaning and loading, spare flints, spanners and other tools, and a bullet mould.

Gallery

See also 

 Code duello
 List of people killed in duels

Notes

References 
Citrations

Bibliography

External links 
 18th and 19th French weapons
 Sir Thomas Mitchell duelling pistols, National Museum of Australia

Single-shot pistols
Black-powder pistols
Dueling
Pistols of the United Kingdom